Big Otter Creek (alternately Otter River, Big Creek) is a waterway that empties into Lake Erie at Port Burwell, Ontario.
The creek's headwaters are north of the Horseshoe Moraine, and its mouth is just west of the Long Point Conservation Area.  Scenic bluffs line the valley as it passes through the moraine.

Carolinian forest

Most of southern Ontario was covered by Carolinian forest, characterized by large, slow-growing hardwood trees, like Oak and Beech.  Very few stands of old growth Carolinian forest remain.

Communities
The creek passes through the communities of Norwich, Otterville, Tillsonburg, Vienna, and Port Burwell.

See also
List of rivers of Ontario

References

Rivers of Elgin County
Landforms of Oxford County, Ontario
Important Bird Areas of Ontario
Tillsonburg
Tributaries of Lake Erie
Long Point Region Conservation Authority